Türkstar was a 2004 Turkish reality television singing competition show based on the popular British show Pop Idol. It was hosted by Seray Sever, Gamze Özçelik and Haldun Dormen. It had extremely low ratings and only lasted one season.

Türkstar is notable for being the only Idol franchise to have featured a singing duo (Meltem Denizci and Emrah Gökelma).

Auditions
The first series of Türkstar had 9 audition cities to find the best talent in all of Turkey, including:
Adana
Ankara
Antalya
Diyarbakır
Edirne
İstanbul
İzmir
Trabzon
Munich, Germany

Türkstar Jury
 Zerrin Özer - Turkish singer.
 Armağan Çağlayan - A&R BMG France.
 Ercan Saatçi - Songwriter & musician.
 Ahmet San - Musician & choreographer.

Contestants

Meltem Denizci & Emrah Gökelma until now remain as the only duo to participate on an Idol show worldwide (auditioned, performed and got voted off together).

Two members of the top 3, Simge Bağdatlı and Sertaç Yanmaz, were born and raised in Germany. The latter was a semifinalist on the first season of Türkstars German equivalent Deutschland sucht den Superstar.

Semi Final Qualifyings
Top 30
Format: 4 out of 10 making it in each week + one Wildcard

Finalists
(ages stated at time of contest)

Notes

Idols (franchise)
Television series by Fremantle (company)
2004 Turkish television series debuts
2004 Turkish television series endings
Kanal D original programming
Turkish television series based on British television series